Francesco Gonin (December 16, 1808 in Turin – September 14, 1889 in Giaveno, near Susa, Piedmont) was an Italian painter, engraver and scenographer.

Early life
Francesco's father Giovanni was of French descent, and his mother Sara Castanier was German. He initially studied under Giovanni Battista Biscarra at the Accademia Albertina. He later learned fresco painting from the scenic designer of the Teatro Regio at Turin, Luigi Vacca, ultimately married Vacca's daughter.

Career 
He illustrated Alessandro Manzoni's I Promessi Sposi (The Betrothed). From 1840 to 1841, he collaborated with Carlo Bellosio to paint the ballroom and hall at the Royal Palace in Turin. Francesco and Bellosio frescoed for the Castello di Racconigi. In 1844, he decorated the walls and ceiling of the theatre in the city of La Spezia. In 1845, the Carignano of Turin was decorated by Francesco. He spent the next year decorating three churches in Turin: San Massimo, San Dalmazzo, and Santissima Annunziata.

He painted the theaters of Asti and Vigevano, the Cathedral of Alessandria, the church Della Sforzesca, and the figures at the waiting hall of the train station of Porta Nuova. He also painted many historical canvases. Among his most notable works are:
La Rocca di Sapay presso Viu (Rocci con pascolo) (1850)
Defense of the body of Patroclos (1842)
Duel of Achilles and Hector (1842)
Battle of Mobaldone (1842)
Surrender of the citadel to the French (1843)
Mossa sulle coste della Bretagna (1844)
Return in family (1846)
Sack of Rome (1853)
Death of Duke of Savoy Charles Emanuele II (1857)
Columbus in Jail (1858)
The forbidden book i daiansati (1859)
Night Verse (1862)
Interesting Visit (1867)
The Guide (1867)
Madonna (1879)
Still-life (1872)
After Meal of family (1873)
Gran Telone del Teatro Reggio 1881

References

External links
 

1808 births
1889 deaths
Artists from Turin
19th-century Italian painters
19th-century Italian male artists
Italian male painters
Accademia Albertina alumni